Desiré du Plessis (born 20 May 1965) is a South African former track and field athlete who competed in the high jump. It was a South African record until it was beaten by Hestrie Cloete. She ranked second in the world in the 1986 season.

Du Plessis won two major medals in her career, both at the African Championships in Athletics, taking bronze in 1992 and 1993. Compatriot Charmaine Weavers and Ivorian Lucienne N'Da were ahead of her each time.

She won five straight national titles at the South African Athletics Championships between 1983 and 1987, becoming the first woman to clear two metres there in the process. She won two further titles in 1993 and 1995.

International competitions

National titles
South African Athletics Championships
High jump: 1983, 1984, 1985, 1986, 1987, 1993, 1995

References

External links



Living people
1965 births
South African female high jumpers
Commonwealth Games competitors for South Africa
Athletes (track and field) at the 1994 Commonwealth Games